"Lisa the Tree Hugger" is the fourth episode of the twelfth season of the American animated television series The Simpsons. It originally aired on the Fox network in the United States on November 19, 2000. In the episode, Lisa falls in love with the leader of a radical environmentalist group and tries to impress him by living in Springfield's oldest tree in order to keep it from being cut down. The episode is based on the story of the American tree sitter Julia Butterfly Hill. Actor Joshua Jackson guest starred in the episode as Jesse.

Plot
Bart, needing money for the new video game console Gamestation 256, takes a job hanging menus on doors for a Thai restaurant. Lisa is concerned that the menus are wasting paper and hurting the environment, but the family ignores her worries. On a trip to Krusty Burger to celebrate Bart's new job, they see protesters dressed as cows on the roof of the restaurant. The protesters unfurl a banner and accuse Krusty Burger of deforesting the rainforest to create grazing land for cattle. The police arrive and shoot the protesters with bean bag rounds. As the protesters are being arrested, Lisa meets their leader—radical environmentalist Jesse Grass—and is instantly smitten with him.

Lisa visits Jesse in jail, but feels intimidated when she sees that he is more dedicated to environmentalism than she is. She attends a meeting of Jesse's activist group, Dirt First, and learns that an ancient tree in Springfield is scheduled for demolition. Jesse asks if anyone in the group would be willing to live in the tree to prevent its destruction. Lisa, hoping to impress him, volunteers. She climbs the tree and sets up camp, but after a few days she begins to miss her family. She sneaks away from the tree at night and goes home to see them, but finds them asleep. She lies down with them and accidentally falls asleep. When she rushes to the tree in the morning, she finds it has collapsed.

Upon returning home, Lisa learns that the tree was not cut down by the loggers, but struck down by lightning (attracted by a metal bucket she left near the top), and that she is presumed dead. When Lisa learns that the forest will be turned into a nature preserve in her honor, she decides not to reveal that she is alive. Marge is angered by Lisa's decision, considering the fact that the Simpson family had suffered bad luck when it comes to farces for a noble cause. Homer and Bart immediately begin to take advantage of the sympathy of the townspeople. But when the Rich Texan decides to turn the forest into an amusement park called "Lisa Land" rather than a nature preserve, Lisa reveals that she survived. Jesse Grass cuts down the log that has been turned into a "Lisa Land" sign, and it slides down a hill and into Springfield's business district, destroying a number of environmentally damaging businesses as well as a hemp clothing company. Jesse is jailed again, and the log travels across the country, passing Mount Rushmore and ultimately winding its way down Lombard Street in San Francisco before reaching the Pacific Ocean and heading out to sea, all set to a parody of "This Land is Your Land" called "This Log is Your Log".

Production and analysis

"Lisa the Tree Hugger" was written by Matt Selman and directed by Steven Dean Moore as part of the twelfth season of The Simpsons (2000–2001). It is based on a story Selman heard on the radio about Julia Butterfly Hill, an American activist and environmentalist who lived in a millennium-old California Redwood tree known as Luna for more than two years between 1997 and 1999 to prevent loggers from cutting it down. The character Jesse Grass was named after Selman's brother Jesse Selman, who according to Matt acts a lot like Jesse Grass. The last name came from Jesse Selman's bluegrass band named Grass. Canadian American actor Joshua Jackson guest starred in the episode as Jesse Grass. Although guest stars most often record their lines with the cast members of the show, Jackson did not. "Lisa the Tree Hugger" originally had a different, more complicated ending compared to what is seen in the episode. The final version was added at the last minute of production.

In his 2007 book Japanamerica: How Japanese Pop Culture Has Invaded the U.S., Roland Kelts analyzed the scenes from the beginning of the episode in which Bart hangs menus on doors for a Thai restaurant. These scenes allude to the film The Matrix. Kelts wrote: "Bart needs cash to buy a Japanese game console, so he takes a job delivering flyers for a Thai restaurant. He is quickly taught martial arts so he can drop off the menus with ninja stealth. He runs sideways along walls, his actions accompanied by staccato swishing noises. At one point the scene freezes, he hangs in the air, and the 'camera' does a 360-degree pan around him. The episode dates back to 2000, a year after the look and feel of The Matrix had seeped into viewers' consciousness, and the makers of The Simpsons were very adroitly appropriating it into their shtick."

Release and reception
The episode originally aired on the Fox network in the United States on November 19, 2000. On August 18, 2009, it was released on DVD as part of the box set The Simpsons – The Complete Twelfth Season. Staff members Mike Scully, Ian Maxtone-Graham, Matt Selman, Don Payne, Tom Gammill, Tim Long, Yeardley Smith, and Steven Dean Moore participated in the DVD audio commentary for the episode. Deleted scenes from the episode were also included on the box set.

Since airing, "Lisa the Tree Hugger" has received generally positive reactions from critics.

DVD Movie Guide's Colin Jacobson described it as "arguably [the season's] best show," adding: "The first act fares best, as I love Marge’s tune about saving, and 'Menu Boy' offers a clever spoof of martial arts-based action flicks. 'Hugger' hits a minor lull when Lisa becomes environmentally active, but it bounces back pretty quickly, and the scenes with the runaway log delight. 'Hugger' provides a winner."

Den of Geek critic Matt Haigh cited "Lisa the Tree Hugger" as one of the highlights of season twelve in his review of the box set.

Jon Perks of The Birmingham Post highlighted the episode in an article mentioning the twelfth season DVD, writing that like the rest of the season's episodes, "Lisa the Tree Hugger" is "sure to put a smile on anyone's face".

References

External links

 
 
 

The Simpsons (season 12) episodes
2000 American television episodes
Television episodes about the environment